Lightricks, founded in January 2013, is a company that develops video and image editing mobile apps, known particularly for its selfie-editing app, Facetune.
Headquartered in Jerusalem, the firm has over 450 employees. As of 2021, its apps have been downloaded over 500 million times.

History
The company was created in 2013 by 5 founders, Ph.D. students Zeev Farbman, Nir Pochter, Yaron Inger, Amit Goldstein, and former Supreme Court of Israel clerk Itai Tsiddon who were all studying at the Hebrew University of Jerusalem. Lightricks began life as a bootstrapped company, which was the subject of a case study from the Harvard Business School "Bootstrapping at Lightricks".

The company  received in 2015 its first funding round of $10 million led by Viola Ventures. It received its second round of funding of $60 million in November 2018, led by Insight Venture Partners and with participation from Israeli VC company ClalTech.  In July 2019, it secured $135 million in series C funding  led by Goldman Sachs, with participation from Insight Partners and ClalTech; this was reported to imply a $1 billion valuation. It puts the total raised to date at $205 million. 
Lightricks ended 2018 with over $50 million in revenue.
In September 2021, the company received $100 million in primary and $30 million in secondary Series D funding. This valued the company at $1.8 billion.

Operations
After beginning in the Hebrew University campus, the company outgrew its space a number of times. It remains based in Jerusalem, Israel, with offices in London, Germany and New York City; it has a total of over 450 employees.

Once Apple Inc allowed it, Lightricks was one of the first app companies to offer subscriptions. Most of its apps are now published under a freemium model.

Products

 Facetune (now superseded by Facetune2) which was named as Apple's most downloaded app in 2017. In 2021 it was ranked as one of Apple's top-5 paid apps for the seventh consecutive year.
 Photoleap (formerly known as Photofox and Enlight), a general image editing app, which was preceded by Enlight Photofox. The app allows the user to generate artwork to be shared on social media with a number of different editing options.
 Lightleap (formerly known as Quickshot), a pre-image viewer. 
 Videoleap, a video editor.
 Motionleap (formerly known as Pixaloop), an image animation tool created in 2018 where one can animate otherwise-still elements of a picture in different ways.
 Beatleap, an audio-first video editing tool. The app features music by Epidemic Sound.
 Artleap (formerly known as QuickArt), a photo editing tool.
 Seen, a story making tool.
 Boosted (formerly known as BoostApps), a graphic design template tool aimed towards social media marketing.
 Facetune Video, a selfie-retouching video tool that allows users to retouch and edit their selfie and portrait videos in real time using a set of A.I.-powered tools.
 Filtertune, a photo filter tool designed to create a community around custom photo filters. With the app, creators can make their own personalized preset photo filters, then share them across social media as photos with a QR code attached.

References

External links 

IOS software
Photo software
Companies based in Jerusalem
Mobile software
Software companies of Israel
Software companies established in 2013
2013 establishments in Israel